In Hinduism, in the Devi Mahatmya, Chanda and Munda are asuras (demons) in the service of Sumbha and Nishumbha. After the death of Dhumralochana, Sumbha sent them to fight Devi Kaushiki. After Chanda and Munda approached Devi Kaushiki, she turned black and Kali sprung from her head and killed them. Then, Kaushiki gave the name Chamunda to Kali. Afterward Raktabīja was sent, but was also slain by Goddess Kali.

See also
 Rambha (asura)
 Raktabīja
 Sumbha and Nisumbha
 Mahishasura
 Dhumralochana
 Sugriva (asura)

References

Danavas